Laughery Township is one of eleven townships in Ripley County, Indiana. As of the 2010 census, its population was 4,736 and it contained 1,894 housing units.

Laughery Township took its name from Laughery Creek.

Geography

Cities and towns
 Batesville (partial)

Unincorporated towns
 Ballstown
 Cross Roads
 Laugheryville

References

External links
 Indiana Township Association
 United Township Association of Indiana

Townships in Ripley County, Indiana
Townships in Indiana